The 1996 Halifax Blue Sox season was the club's first season in the Super League. Coached by Steve Simms, the Halifax Blue Sox competed in Super League I and finished in 6th place. The club also reached the quarter final of the Challenge Cup.

Table

Squad
Statistics include appearances and points in the Super League and Challenge Cup.

Transfers

In

Out

References

External links
Halifax Blue Sox - Rugby League Project

Halifax Blue Sox
Halifax R.L.F.C.
English rugby league club seasons